Harold Dwight Scott (July 8, 1923 – September 21, 2010) was an American sportscaster. He worked primarily at Minneapolis's television station WCCO-TV in 1960s and 1970s. He also worked for CBS. He was the television voice for the Minnesota Vikings from 1965 to 1967 on CBS games. He was the brother of fellow sportscaster Ray Scott.

External links
Obituary in Star Tribune

1923 births
2010 deaths
20th-century American journalists
American male journalists
United States Army personnel of World War II
American television sports announcers
College football announcers
Major League Baseball broadcasters
Minnesota Twins announcers
Minnesota Vikings announcers
National Football League announcers
People from Connellsville, Pennsylvania